Megalogomphus hannyngtoni, is a species of dragonfly in the family Gomphidae. It is known only from the Western Ghats of India.

Description and habitat
It is a large dragonfly with bottle-green eyes. Its thorax is black; marked with bright greenish-yellow stripes. Abdomen is black, marked with bright citron-yellow. Segment 1 has a small apical dorsal triangle and the whole of the sides. Segment 2 has
a dorsal and a lateral stripe, broad at the base. Segment 3 has a dorsal stripe and a lateral wedge-shaped spot at the base. Segments 4 and 5 have a chain of three dorsal spots. Segment 6 has a single baso-dorsal spo. Segment 7 has more than the basal half yellow. Segments 8 and 9 have small lateral basal triangular spots. Segment 10 is entirely black. Anal appendages are black.

This species is found in forested mountain streams and patrol the banks. They usually perch on overhanging twigs and rarely on rocks in hill streams. It breeds in fast flowing hill streams.

See also
 List of odonates of India
 List of odonata of Kerala

References

Gomphidae
Taxa named by Frederic Charles Fraser